Salma Sultana is a veterinarian, entrepreneur, and researcher. She is the recipient of the 2020 The Norman E. Borlaug Award for field research and application. She has also been honored by World Food Prize Foundation. Sultana has received this award for her innovative model of providing veterinary outreach, treatment, and education to thousands of small-scale farmers in Bangladesh.

She is also listed in the top 100 Asian Scientists list for her innovation in veterinary treatment, education, and extension services through Model Livestock Advancement Foundation. This list is published by Asian Scientist Magazine.

Early life and education 
Sultana was born in Sirajganj and brought up in different Bangladesh districts, but she is now based in Dhaka, Bangladesh. She graduated with a Doctor of Veterinary Medicine (DVM) from Chittagong Veterinary and Animal Sciences University in 2010 (held in 2012). She got clinical training at Tamil Nadu Veterinary and Animal Sciences University. She got her master's degree in Pharmacology from CVASU in 2014. While working on her master's degree, she started researching on antimicrobial activities of medicinal plants and their anthelmintic efficacy.

Career 
After completing graduation, Sultana started his career as a veterinary officer in a community-based veterinary foundation. While working at the foundation, she realized that there was a significant gap between the availability and the demand for animal healthcare in rural areas. She observed that farmers, whose livelihoods are heavily dependent on their livestock could not afford proper treatment, and thus they sometimes resorted to untrained doctors or treating the animals on their own. Malpractice of quack doctors, farmer's unawareness, growing AMR, and unemployment, these were made her think and motivated to work for the country in the livestock sector.

In 2014, after she completed her post-graduate education, she created Model Livestock Institute. In the same year, she also started an outdoor veterinary hospital named Model Livestock Institute Veterinary Hospital, which is engaged with various treatments and services for domestic animals, pet animals, and birds. It has a small laboratory for facilitating evidence-based health services. In 2018, the Hospital developed VetSheba, a call center and online service that farmers can use to speak directly to a doctor or expert consultant and be referred to receive a check-up from a livestock health service provider in their area.

Sultana created an NGO named Model Livestock Advancement Foundation (MLAF) in 2015. It is a nonprofit organization for animal healthcare, technical education, and research-based organization in Bangladesh. This focuses on women empowerment, youth employment, food security and safety, one health approach, antimicrobial resistance control, herd health improvement, and animal welfare. She created two projects during the COVID-19 pandemic situation. One was providing animal feed to the farmers and the other providing fresh farm food (meat, milk, and egg) to the customers which is tested in the lab by the name of “Safe and Green Bazaar”.

Awards 
 Asian Scientist 100
 Norman E. Borlaug Award for Field Research and Application 2020
 Australia Awards-2021-Women in STEM
 Anannya Top Ten Awards
 COVID-19 Fighter International Honors-2020
 International Arch of Europe for Quality and Technology Award 2018
 Young Change Maker Award 2018
 Youth Icon Award 2018 
 Joy Bangla Youth Award 2017
 Mother Teresa Award 2017

Writing 
Sultana is a professional trainer and an educator. She has written 9 professional books and 5 manuals for her students.

Books
 Basic Veterinary Anatomy and Physiology
 Easy learning of Veterinary Pathology 
 Parasitic Profile 
 Basic Concept of Pharmacology 
 Rural Livestock Entrepreneurship 
 Livestock Business
 Ruminant Animal Production 
 Non-ruminant Animal Production 
Manuals
 Poultry Production
 Backyard Farming 
 Fodder Cultivation
 Beef Fattening

References 

Women veterinarians
Year of birth missing (living people)
Living people
Bangladeshi scientists